is a Japanese direct-to-video and streaming television series produced in cooperation with Fuji TV, Bandai, and Dentsu. The series is centered on the fictional girl group of the same name, who lead a double life as normal middle school students and must hide the fact that they are idol singers in their daily lives.

Secret Girls ran for a total of two seasons, with 19 episodes released between 2011 and 2013. Each episode was distributed on the Ciao Ciao TV! DVD discs that were included as a bonus in the monthly  manga magazine Ciao, with the episode later made available on Fuji TV's online streaming service, in the same month.

Secret Girls launched a brief singing career for the cast, who performed as their characters at music events. In addition, manga and light novel adaptations were published, along with a merchandise toy line.

Synopsis

Third-year middle school students Rio Shibaski and Maya Aramaki are fans of Secrets, an idol girl group whose personal lives and identities remain private. Rio and Maya later find out that the members of Secrets are their classmates, and they are recruited into the group. The five girls begin performing under the name Secret Girls and must continue to keep their double lives separate and a secret from others.

Cast

Episodes

Each episode of Secret Girls was released monthly through the Ciao Ciao TV! DVD discs that were included as a bonus in the  manga magazine Ciao, with the episode later made available on Fuji TV's online streaming service,  in the same month. Throughout the show's broadcast, Secret Girls was used in commercials for Curl C Girl, a hairpiece line by Bandai.

A second season was serialized monthly beginning with the August 2012 issue of Ciao, which released on July 3, 2012. The digital broadcast of the series was also made available on iTunes.

Season 1 (2011)

Season 2 (2012)

Discography

Secret Girls briefly launched a singing career for the main cast of the show, where they released music under the group name Secret Girls and performed as their characters at live events. They held their first live concert in July 2011. They also performed at the Tokyo Idol Festival 2011 Eco & Smile event on April 6, 2012.

On March 21, 2012, they released the single "Secret Girls." The single contained the songs "Go! My Way!", "A Little Star", and "Change the World", which were featured in the show. The limited edition contained a DVD disc containing footage of their 2011 concert, a choreography lesson, and behind-the-scenes footage for their music videos.

Singles

Other media

Manga

A manga adaptation by Pochi Kashiwa titled  was serialized in the monthly magazine Ciao beginning with the September 2011 issue released on August 3, 2011 to the May 2013 issue released on April 3, 2013. The chapters were later released in 2 bound volumes by Shogakukan under the Ciao Comics imprint.

Light novels

The light novel series is published by Shogakukan under the Shogakukan Junior Bunko imprint.

References

External links
 

2011 web series debuts
2013 web series endings
Children's manga
Direct-to-video television series
Drama web series
Fictional musical groups
Fuji TV dramas
Japanese children's television series
Japanese idols in anime and manga
Japanese web series